Gandugali Kumara Rama is a 2006 Indian Kannada-language biographical film based on the life of Kumara Rama (1290 AD – 1320 AD), who is considered to be the warrior prince prior to the establishment of the Vijayanagara Empire. Directed by H. R. Bhargava and produced by Anitha Pattabhiram, the film threads the path of a novel written by Su. Rudramurthy Shastry. The film stars Shiva Rajkumar in dual roles with Rambha, Laya and Anita Hassanandani in pivotal roles. It was during the filming of this movie that Shivrajkumar's father and veteran actor Rajkumar died.

Legend 
Kampili in Karnataka was ruled by Maharaja Devaraya, who had successfully resisted the Yadavas or Seunas of Devagiri, Kakatiyas and Hoysalas. His son Yuvaraja Ramanatha, popularly known as Kumara Rama (1290–1320), a great hero, was exiled due to the intrigues of his step mother. He is still remembered and worshipped in every part of Karnataka and also in some bordering districts of Andhra Pradesh irrespective of castes. Many castes, especially agrarian communities, considered him as their family deity and organise fairs and festivals every year in and around Karnataka.  The Kings of Kampili belonged to the Valmiki Nayaka lineage of  Kshatriya Bedar tribe, locally known as Bedars, Ramoshis and Boyars. Harihara I and Bukka Raya I, the founders of great Vijayanagara Empire were the nephews of prince Kumara Rama. The mother of these two brothers was Maravve Nayakiti, the elder sister of Prince Kumara Rama.

Cast 
 Shiva Rajkumar as Kumara Rama / Channa Rama (Dual role)
 Rambha
 Laya as Ramale
 Anita Hassanandani as Ratna
 Ashok
 Srinivasa Murthy as Devaraya
 Avinash
 Ramesh Bhat
 Seetha
 Sumithra
 Doddanna
 C. R. Simha
 Suchitra
 Bhagyashree
 Kishore
 Dharma
 Aravind
 Karibasavaiah
 Honnavalli Krishna

Soundtrack 
The soundtrack for the movie was composed by Gurukiran.

References 

2006 films
2000s Kannada-language films
Films scored by Gurukiran
Indian biographical drama films
Indian historical drama films
Indian war drama films
Biographical action films
2006 biographical drama films
Films directed by H. R. Bhargava
Indian historical action films
2006 drama films